Dunderdale may refer to:

 Tommy Dunderdale (1887-1960), ice hockey player
 Kathy Dunderdale, Canadian politician
 Wilfred Dunderdale (1899-1990), British spy and intelligence officer
 Len Dunderdale (1915-1989), English footballer
 Betty, Hazel or Julie Dunderdale, members of the 60s English vocal trio The Dale Sisters